Louis-Jules Dumoulin (Paris, 1860–1924) was a French artist and painter. He traveled in East Asia and was the founder of the Société Coloniale des Artistes Français in 1908.

Dumoulin is an Orientalist painter linked to the official artistic circles and a great traveler from the various missions that will be entrusted to him. He made his first major trip outside Europe in 1888 on the occasion of an official mission to Japan ordered by the Ministry of Education. 2.

In 1908 he co-founded the Colonial Society of French Artists and was its president until his death in 1924.

References

 Artnet, s.v. "Dumoulin, Louis-Jules". Accessed 10 December 2006.
 Union List of Artists Names, s.v. "Dumoulin, Louis-Jules". Accessed 10 December 2006.
 .
2. Louis Dumoulin sollicite officiellement pour une mission au Japon la Direction des Beaux-Arts le 14 octobre 1887 et obtient une réponse favorable signée de Jules-Antoine Castagnary lui annonçant que l’arrêté ministériel est pris trois jours plus tard (cf. Archives nationales, dossier Dumoulin des missions du ministère de l'Instruction publique, cote F21-2285, pièces no 15 et no 11).

1860 births
1924 deaths
19th-century French painters
French male painters
20th-century French painters
20th-century French male artists
19th-century French male artists